Hwang Ok-sil (born 25 March 1972 in Pyeongyang) is a North Korean short track speed skater, who won bronze in the 500 m at the 1992 Winter Olympics.

External links
 
 

1972 births
Living people
North Korean female short track speed skaters
Short track speed skaters at the 1992 Winter Olympics
Olympic short track speed skaters of North Korea
Olympic bronze medalists for North Korea
Olympic medalists in short track speed skating
Medalists at the 1992 Winter Olympics
20th-century North Korean women